The Carlos Palanca Memorial Awards for Literature winners in the year 1986 (rank, title of winning entry, name of author).


English division
Short story
First prize: “Merlie” by Jose Y. Dalisay Jr.
Second prize: “The Other Side” by Jose Y. Dalisay Jr.
Third prize: “The Judge” by Cesar Felipe Bacani Jr.

Poetry
First prize: “Portraits, Tributes, Protestations, Protests” by Mariano Kilates
Second prize: “Poet's Dozen” by Eli Ang Barroso
Third prize: “Between Places” by Ma. Fatima V. Lim; and “Disclosures” by Ma. Luisa A. Igloria

Essay
First prize: “Dateline Manila: A Foreign Journalist's Odyssey” by Wilma Vitug
Second prize: “Revolt of Spectacles” by Herminio Beltran Jr.
Third prize: “The Men and Women in Bilibid” by Constantino Tejero

One-act play
First prize: No winner
Second prize: No winner
Third prize: “Airport on Mactan Island” by Leoncio P. Deriada
Special mention “Celadon” by Ametta Suarez-Taguchi

Full-length play
First prize: “Balaring” by Ametta Suarez-Taguchi
Second prize: “Aria or Madame Macro's Massive Pentimiento” by Ed delos Santos Cabagnot
Third prize: “Lapulapu of Mactan” by Mig Alvarez Enriquez

Filipino division
Short story
First prize: “Ang Damo sa Fort Bonifacio” by Cyrus P. Borja
Second prize: “Syeyring” by Jun Cruz Reyes
Third prize: “Talahib” by Edgardo B. Maranan

Poetry
First prize: “Panahon ng Pagpuksa at Iba pang Pakikidigma” by Teo Antonio
Second prize: “Mga Himaymay ng Paglalamay” by Ariel Dim. Borlongan
Third prize: “Syeyring at iba pang Tula” by Jun Cruz Reyes

Essay
First prize: “Si Edgardo M. Reyes: Ang Manunulat, Kanyang Akda at Panahon” by Rogelio Mangahas
Second prize: “Ang Tiyanak sa Landas ni Rio Alma” by Fidel Rillo, Jr.
Third prize: “Ilang Talang Luma Buhat sa Talaarawan ng Isang May Nunal sa Talampakan” by Jun Cruz Reyes

One-act play
First prize: “Ang mga Tattoo ni Emmanuel Resureccion” by Reynaldo A. Duque
Second prize: “Haplos ng Dahas” by Roberto Jose De Guzman
Third prize: “Alimuom” by Reuel Molina Aguila; and “Sa Huling Gabi ng Palabas” by Rolando Dela Cruz

Full-length play
First prize: “Bayan Mo” by Bienvenido Noriega Jr.
Second prize: “Juan dela Cruz, New York City” by Lito Casaje
Third prize: “Ang Hepe” by Rene O. Villanueva

References
 

Palanca Awards
Palanca Awards, 1986